The 1974–75 Michigan Tech Huskies men's ice hockey team represented Michigan Tech University in college ice hockey. In its 19th year under head coach John MacInnes the team compiled a 32–10–0 record and reached the NCAA tournament for the fourth time in its history. The Huskies defeated Minnesota 6–1 in the championship game at the St. Louis Arena in St. Louis, Missouri, a rematch of the previous season's championship game.

Season

Streaking
After coming up just shy in 1973–74 Michigan Tech entered the season with one goal; winning the national championship. Jim Warden, as the only goaltender on the team who wasn't a freshman, was given the opportunity to assume control of the Huskies' crease and played well at the start. With MTU's high-powered offense clicking the Huskies easily won their first four games, outscoring the opposition by a 27–13 margin, winning each contest by at least 3 goals. However, when Tech met their first tough competition they hit a rough patch. Over a three week span, despite playing four of six contests at home, the Huskies lost five of six games, all against WCHA opponents. Michigan Tech was able to score in most games but their defense surrendered no less than four goals in each match. The losing streak left Tech with a .500 record overall and a 3–5 mark in conference; disastrous numbers for a team hoping to challenge for a national title.

Warden and the defensive corps led by team captain Bob Lorimer needed to raise their game and the weekend series against three week conference opponents couldn't have come at a better time. A six game winning streak countered their losing skid and the Huskies were back in contention for home ice in the WCHA Tournament. Just before the winter break Tech headed to Minneapolis to take on the defending national champions and saw their rise up the standings halted with two losses to Minnesota.

Holiday Season
At the end of December Michigan Tech made their way to Detroit and served as host for the 10th Great Lakes Invitational. The Huskies dominated Yale in the first game then squeezed past Michigan with a 3–2 win to capture their first GLI championship in three years. After two weeks off the Huskies resumed their schedule against the Wolverines and split the home series. The win came in the second match and provided Jim Warden with his first shutout of the season. After spending two weeks walking over bottom-feeders Denver and North Dakota Tech made their first appearance in the new Munn Ice Arena. The Huskies housewarming present was to defeat Michigan State twice and raise their record to 20–8.

Down the Stretch
Michigan Tech held its Winter Carnival at the beginning of February and played host to Minnesota–Duluth. After raising their winning streak to 8 games Tech lost the second contest which left them just two points ahead of Colorado College in the standings. After taking both games at Notre Dame Tech was shutout by Wisconsin before rebounding in the second match.

With only one weekend series remaining, Tech found itself tied with CC as both had identical 20–10 conference records. The Tigers were going to take on 9th-place Denver with the Huskies were faced with Minnesota, who had already won the WCHA championship and guaranteed themselves the top seed. The Gophers were flat in their first game, allowing Tech to easily take the contest 7–0 with Warden tying the school record with his third shutout of the season. CC lost their first game against the Pioneers so all Tech needed was a tie to get the second seed. In their second match Minnesota gave the Huskies all they had but Tech was able to pull out a 5–4 victory and give themselves home ice for the duration of the conference tournament.

Playoffs
Notre Dame arrived in Houghton for the first round of the conference playoffs just two days after the regular season wrapped up. While both teams were presumably tired the Huskies shut the Irish down, winning both games with Jim Warden setting  anew program record with his fourth shutout of the season (still a Michigan Tech record as of 2019). The Huskies were able to rest for a day while both the 3rd- and 4th-seeded teams lost, leaving Michigan State as the Huskies opponent. While the Spartans only had a short way to travel from Madison, they were forced to play games on four consecutive nights while the Huskies were able to get a day off in between the two rounds. The tired Spartan defense was no match for Tech who put up 15 goals in the two games and won both to earn their second consecutive WCHA Tournament championship and 7th overall. Even more impressive was the fact that Michigan Tech produced a 30-win season, only the second such occurrence in the history of college hockey (and the first of only two times they've accomplished that feat as of 2019).

Michigan Tech made their 8th NCAA Tournament appearance as the 2nd western due to Minnesota being the other WCHA winner. As a result MTU was pitted against ECAC champion Boston University who had the offensive firepower to rival their own. The Terriers opened the scoring in the semifinal and the two teams traded leads in the opening frame before heading to the locker room tied 2-all. When the second period began the Huskies charged out of the gate and scored three times in under six minutes. BU was able to get one goal to close the gap but Bob D'Alvise' second goal of the game restored the 3-goal lead. with just under two minutes to play in the period Mike Fidler was called for a major high-sticking penalty, giving MTU a 5-minutes man-advantage. Bill Steele scored just 21 seconds into the power play while George Lyle and Mike Zuke added their own markers early in the third period. With the score 9–3 as a result the game was essentially over and though the Terriers netted two more before time expired the Huskies had proved themselves the better breed.

National championship
The championship game became a rematch of the previous year's finale with Tech looking for revenge against Minnesota. Interestingly enough, both Minnesota and Michigan Tech had entered the NCAA tournament as the first teams in 14 years to record 30 wins and with each having won their semifinal meetings both shared the record for the most wins in a season. That record, however, was secondary to the game itself. The two teams played before a crowd of nearly 7,000 people, far below the maximum capacity of the St. Louis Arena  but much more than they were used to seeing. Michigan Tech scored first, just past the halfway mark of the opening frame and added a second from Zuke with 64 seconds remaining. Tech's defense held the Gophers to only 7 shots in the period and continued their stifling play throughout the game. The Huskies themselves were held to only 5 shots on goal in the second but they made them count, doubling their lead to 4–0 after forty minutes. The final period saw more of the same with the Huskies tying their own championship record with six consecutive goals from the start of the game. Minnesota's Tom Younghans finally got the puck past Jim Warden mid way through the final period but by then it was too late and Michigan Tech won their third national championship as well as set a new NCAA record with 32 wins on the year.

With his almost shutout of the Gophers, Jim Warden was named as the tournament MOP and was joined on the All-Tournament Team by Bob Lorimer, Bob D'Alvise and Steve Jensen. D'Alvise finished third in the nation in scoring and was named to the AHCA All-American West Team. He also made an appearance on the All-WCHA First Team with Warden while Lorimer and Mike Zuke made the WCHA Second Team.

The following year Warden would be the starting goaltender for the US national team at the Winter Olympics, joined by fellow Michigan Tech alums Steve Jensen and Paul Jensen.

Standings

Schedule

|-
!colspan=12 style=";" | Regular Season

|-
!colspan=12 style=";" | 

|-
!colspan=12 style=";" | 

|-
!colspan=12 style=";" |

Roster and scoring statistics

Goaltending statistics

1975 championship game

(W1) Minnesota vs. (W2) Michigan Tech

Players drafted into the NHL/WHA

1975 NHL Amateur Draft

1975 WHA Amateur Draft

References

Michigan Tech Huskies men's ice hockey seasons
Michigan Tech
Michigan Tech
Michigan Tech
Michigan Tech
Michigan Tech
Michigan Tech